Intact Insurance Specialty Solutions is the brand used by Intact Financial to provide specialty insurance products in Canada and the United States. These products are sold through independent agencies, regional and national brokers, wholesalers and managing general agencies, to over 20 industry and customer groups.

History

2001- White Mountains/CGU 
On June 1, 2001, White Mountains Insurance Group, Ltd. acquired CGU's U.S. operations, and the company was renamed OneBeacon Insurance Group after the company's former "hometown" address of 1 Beacon Street in Boston.

CGU had its roots in a merger between Commercial Union and General Accident Insurance.

2006- IPO & Specialty Niche 
In 2001, the company had two specialty businesses—International Marine Underwriters and A.W.G. Dewar, ocean marine and tuition refund specialists, respectively. OneBeacon began forming additional specialty segments, starting with OneBeacon Professional Insurance (OBPI) in 2002. In 2006, the company held its initial public offering (IPO), and began a full-specialization approach, starting new segments through teams of people or business acquisitions. Between 2009 and 2010, the company sold its non-specialty commercial lines renewal rights and personal lines.

2017- OneBeacon Acquired by Intact Financial Corporation 
On September 28, 2017, (former) OneBeacon Insurance Group, Ltd. was acquired by Intact Financial Corporation. The merger created a leading specialty insurer in North America, combining Intact's leading commercial lines track record, deep data, claims and digital expertise with OneBeacon's team and specialty lines capabilities.

2020 - OneBeacon Insurance Group becomes Intact Insurance Specialty Solutions 
On October 14, 2020, Intact Financial Corporation officially brought together its Canadian and U.S. specialty capabilities under a single brand: Intact Insurance Specialty Solutions. The U.S. businesses had formerly operated under the OneBeacon Insurance Group and The Guarantee Company of North America brands in the U.S., following the 2017 and 2019 acquisitions of these specialty companies, respectively.

Specialty Businesses
Today, Intact Insurance Specialty Solutions features multiple specialty insurance products and services, and, through its underwriting companies, offers coverages in all 50 states. The company's specialty businesses include A.W.G. Dewar, Accident & Health, Entertainment, Environmental, Financial Institutions, Financial Services, Inland Marine, Management Liability, Ocean Marine, Public Entities, Specialty Property, Surety and Technology Insurance.

References

External links

 OneBeacon Insurance Group homepage
 

Financial services companies established in 2001
OneBeacon
Companies formerly listed on the New York Stock Exchange
Insurance companies of Bermuda
Companies established in 2001